Erika Enzenhofer (born 2 September 1926) was an Austrian gymnast. She competed in the women's artistic team all-around event at the 1948 Summer Olympics.

References

External links
 

1926 births
Possibly living people
Austrian female artistic gymnasts
Olympic gymnasts of Austria
Gymnasts at the 1948 Summer Olympics
Place of birth missing (living people)
20th-century Austrian women